Jeffrey D. Spraker (born March 13, 1959) is an American professional stock car racing driver and crew chief. He currently works as a crew chief for the No. 25 Chevrolet Camaro driven by Chris Cockrum.

Racing career

Spraker has 23 NASCAR Busch Series starts. In his first start, he started 26th and finished 27th after an engine failure.

Crew chiefing career

Motorsports career results

NASCAR
(key) (Bold – Pole position awarded by qualifying time. Italics – Pole position earned by points standings or practice time. * – Most laps led.)

Busch Series

Craftsman Truck Series

Busch North Series

Winston Modified Tour

ARCA Re/Max Series
(key) (Bold – Pole position awarded by qualifying time. Italics – Pole position earned by points standings or practice time. * – Most laps led.)

References

External links
 
 
 

1959 births
Living people
NASCAR drivers
NASCAR team owners
NASCAR crew chiefs
ARCA Menards Series drivers
People from Latham, New York
Racing drivers from New York (state)